Tadeusz Iwiński (born 28 October 1944) is a Polish politician. He was from 1991 to 2015 a member of the Sejm (the lower house of the Polish parliament), elected to represent the Olsztyn electoral district from the list presented by the Democratic Left Alliance (Sojusz Lewicy Demokratycznej). He had earlier (1967–1990) been a long-serving member of the communist Polish United Workers Party (Polska Zjednoczona Partia Robotnicza).

In 1968 Iwiński obtained an MSc in industrial chemistry from the Warsaw University of Technology and he later studied at the Faculty of Journalism and Political Science of the University of Warsaw. In 1973 he was awarded a PhD in International Affairs. In 1981, during the period of martial law introduced by the Jaruzelski government, Iwiński was appointed to the post of assistant professor at the Polish United Workers Party Central Committee's Higher School of Social Science (Wyższa Szkoła Nauk Społecznych KC PZPR). In 1977–1978 he was a Fulbright Scholar (at Harvard University) and he obtained a second scholarship from the International Research & Exchanges Board (IREX) in 1988, becoming a scholar at the University of California, Berkeley. In the 1980s he was a scholar at the United Nations University in Tokyo. After returning to Poland he taught at the University of Warmia and Mazury in Olsztyn where, in 1999, he became a professor. Iwiński has been active in several scientific and political institutions concerned with African, Asian, and Oceanian affairs and studies. He was a member of The Committee on Political Science of the Polish Academy of Sciences. Iwiński is a serving member of the governing council of the Association of European Parliamentarians with Africa.

He has been a member of the Parliamentary Assembly of the Council of Europe since 1992. The investigation by the European Stability Initiative revealed Iwinski's engagement in Azerbaijani “Caviar Diplomacy”. Co-rapporteur on Azerbaijan in PACE in 2014-2015 he was one of the main apologists of the country systematically protecting the Azerbaijani government from criticism on human rights. He participated in parliamentary and presidential elections in Azerbaijan as an observer and issued reports which were significantly less critical than the findings of the OSCE/ODIHR observers. He lost in 2015 elections in Poland and is not PACE member anymore.

Publications
Iwiński's publications include
Współczesny neokolonializm – Contemporary neocolonialism – 1979 / 1986
Burżuazyjne i emigracyjne próby deprecjacji roli i polityki PZPR (red.) – Bourgeois and exile attempts to depreciate the role and policy of the PZPR (ed.) – 1980–85
Geneza, źródła i rola antykomunistycznej krucjaty w strategii i taktyce amerykańskiego imperializmu – Genesis, sources, and role of the anti-communist crusade in the strategy and tactics of American imperialism – 1983

See also
Members of the Polish Sejm 2005–2007
Members of the Polish Sejm 2007–2011
Members of the Polish Sejm 2011–2015

References

External links
Official site
Tadeusz Iwiński - parliamentary page - includes declarations of interest, voting record, and transcripts of speeches

1944 births
Living people
People from Pruszków County
Members of the Polish Sejm 2005–2007
Members of the Polish Sejm 2001–2005
Members of the Polish Sejm 1997–2001
Members of the Polish Sejm 1993–1997
Members of the Polish Sejm 1991–1993
Democratic Left Alliance politicians
Harvard University people
University of California, Berkeley people
Warsaw University of Technology alumni
University of Warsaw alumni
Democratic Left Alliance MEPs
MEPs for Poland 2004
Recipients of the Order of the Cross of Terra Mariana, 2nd Class
Members of the Polish Sejm 2007–2011
Members of the Polish Sejm 2011–2015
Academic staff of the University of Warmia and Mazury in Olsztyn